Notable alumni of Lowell High School, San Francisco, have been cataloged by the Lowell High Alumni Association. Alumni include:

References

Lowell High School (San Francisco) alumni